Agraman is a Hebrew-language surname. Notable people with this surname include:
Nadav Argaman (born 1960), Israeli intelligence officer  
 (born 1947), Israeli writer and military historian
 (borh 1955),  Israeli actress, writer, film director and producer
, IDF general

Hebrew-language surnames